K-1 World MAX 2004 World Tournament Final was a kickboxing and martial arts event promoted by the K-1 organization.  It was the third K-1 MAX final for middleweight kickboxers (70 kg/154 lb weight class) involving eight finalists and two reserve fighters, with all bouts fought under K-1 rules.  Seven of the eight finalists had won elimination fights at the K-1 World MAX 2004 World Tournament Open, while the last finalist and both reserve fighters were invited despite suffering defeats.  As well as tournament matches there was also an opening fight, fought under K-1 rules and a super fight fought under K-1 mixed rules (2 rounds of kickboxing, 2 rounds of MMA).  In total there were fourteen fighters at the event, representing nine countries.

The tournament winner was Buakaw Por. Pramuk who won the ten million yen first prize by defeating reigning K-1 MAX champion and pre-tournament favourite Masato in the final by unanimous decision after an extra extension round.  It was an excellent victory for the relatively unknown Thai who would burst on to the global kickboxing scene and would go on to become a real force in the middleweight division.  The other notable result saw popular local MMA fighter Norifumi "Kid" Yamamoto defeat kickboxer Yasuhiro Kazuya in their special MMA vs kickboxing match.  The event was held in Tokyo at the Yoyogi National Gymnasium, on Wednesday, 7 July 2004 in front of 14,000 spectators.

K-1 World MAX 2004 World Tournament Final

* Despite defeat Jadamba Narantungalag is invited to tournament as finalist

Results

See also
List of K-1 events
List of K-1 champions
List of male kickboxers

References

External links
K-1 Official Website
K-1sport.de - Your Source for Everything K-1

K-1 MAX events
2004 in kickboxing
Kickboxing in Japan
Sports competitions in Tokyo
2004 in Japanese sport